Springerville Municipal Airport  is a town-owned public-use airport located  west of the central business district of Springerville, a town in Apache County, Arizona, United States. The airport is included in the FAA's National Plan of Integrated Airport Systems for 2009–2013, which categorizes it as a general aviation facility.

Facilities and aircraft 
It has two asphalt paved runways: 3/21 is 8,422 by 75 feet (2,567 x 23 m) and 11/29 is 4,603 by 60 feet (1,403 x 18 m).

For the 12-month period ending April 28, 2010, the airport had 4,500 aircraft operations, an average of 12 per day: 93% general aviation and 4% air taxi, and 2% military. At that time there were 21 aircraft based at this airport: 81% single-engine, 9.5% multi-engine and 9.5% ultralight.

References

External links 
 Springerville Municipal Airport
 Springerville Municipal Airport at Arizona DOT airport directory 
 Aerial image as of 13 October 1997 from USGS The National Map
 
 
 
 

Airports in Apache County, Arizona